Judge Ervin may refer to:

Robert Tait Ervin (1863–1949), judge of the United States District Court for the Southern District of Alabama
Samuel James Ervin III (1926–1999), judge of the United States Court of Appeals for the Fourth Circuit

See also
Justice Ervin (disambiguation)